Mariannette Jane Miller-Meeks (born September 6, 1955) is an American physician and politician serving as a U.S. representative since 2021. She has represented Iowa's 1st congressional district since 2023 and represented the 2nd district from 2021 to 2023. A member of the Republican Party, Miller-Meeks served as Iowa state senator for the 41st district from 2019 to 2021. Her district includes most of Iowa's southeastern quadrant, including Davenport, Bettendorf, Burlington, Iowa City, and Miller-Meeks's hometown of Ottumwa.

Miller-Meeks ran three unsuccessful campaigns for the U.S. House against Dave Loebsack. When Loebsack retired in 2020, she ran again and defeated Rita Hart by a margin of six votes. She was reelected in 2022 by a margin of nearly seven percentage points.

Early life 
Miller-Meeks was born in Herlong, California, in 1955. She enlisted in the United States Army at the age of 18 and served for 24 years, including as a nurse, physician, and member of the United States Army Reserve. She retired at the rank of lieutenant colonel.

A first-generation college student, Miller-Meeks earned a Bachelor of Science in Nursing degree from Texas Christian University, a Master of Science in education from the University of Southern California, and a Doctor of Medicine from University of Texas Health Science Center at Houston.

Early career 
Miller-Meeks operated a private ophthalmology practice in Ottumwa, Iowa, until 2008. She also served as the first female president of the Iowa Medical Society. She was the first woman on the faculty of the University of Iowa's department of ophthalmology and visual sciences, and worked as a representative from Iowa to the American Academy of Ophthalmology. In 2010, Governor Terry Branstad appointed Miller-Meeks director of the Iowa Department of Public Health; she resigned in 2014 to run for Congress.

Iowa State Senate (2019 - 2021) 
When Mark Chelgren announced he was not running for reelection, she ran for Iowa Senate, District 41 in 2018, defeating Democratic nominee Mary Stewart. Her term in the Iowa Senate began January 14, 2019.

U.S. House of Representatives

Elections

2008, 2010, 2014 

Miller-Meeks was the Republican nominee for Iowa's 2nd congressional district in 2008, 2010 and 2014, losing to Dave Loebsack in all three races.

2014 

In her 2014 campaign, Miller-Meeks opposed the Affordable Care Act (Obamacare). She also stated her opposition to legalized abortion except in cases of rape, incest, or harm to the mother. She opposed same-sex marriage. She criticized EPA regulation of waterways and coal plants, saying it creates uncertainty for farmers.

2020 

Miller-Meeks ran to represent Iowa's 2nd congressional district again in 2020, following Loebsack's retirement. She won the June 2 Republican primary election, defeating former Illinois Congressman Bobby Schilling.

During the COVID-19 pandemic, she said she "practices social distancing, wears a mask in public and sanitizes her hands" but does not support face mask mandates.

She faced the Democratic nominee, former State Senator Rita Hart, in the November general election. After Loebsack announced his retirement, journalists and election forecasters labeled the 2nd congressional district a swing district. Miller-Meeks defeated Hart in the general election by six votes, making this the closest election in 2020 and flipping Iowa's 2nd Congressional District from Democratic to Republican control in one of the closest races in 100 years; the state certified the victory. Hart contested the certified result through a petition with the Committee on House Administration under the 1969 Federal Contested Elections Act, which sets forth procedures for contesting state election results in the House under the Constitution. Hart did not contest the election in Iowa's courts. In her petition, Hart contended, without evidence, that 22 legally cast votes were not counted. Had they been counted, per her petition, she would have won the race by nine votes.

House Speaker Nancy Pelosi provisionally seated Miller-Meeks on January 3, 2021, pending adjudication of Hart's petition. The Committee on House Administration reviewed Hart's petition, and Pelosi claimed the House had the authority to expel Miller-Meeks, but on March 31, Hart withdrew her challenge.

Miller-Meeks and Michelle Fischbach are the only Republican members of Congress to flip Democratic House districts that were not held by Republicans in the 115th Congress before 2018.

2022 

Miller-Meeks ran for reelection, this time in Iowa's 1st congressional district, for the 2022 elections. During redistricting, her home in Ottumwa was drawn into the neighboring 3rd district, but almost all of her former territory was drawn into the 1st, effectively trading district numbers with fellow Republican freshman Ashley Hinson. Members of the House are only required to live in the state they represent. Miller-Meeks defeated Democratic nominee Christina Bohannan in the November 2022 general election.

Tenure
Miller-Meeks, along with all other Senate and House Republicans, voted against the American Rescue Plan Act of 2021.

On May 19, 2021, Miller-Meeks was one of 35 Republicans who joined all Democrats in voting to approve legislation to establish the January 6, 2021 commission meant to investigate the storming of the U.S. Capitol.

Infrastructure 
In 2020, Miller-Meeks said that an infrastructure bill would be her main priority, suggesting a fuel tax increase to pay for it.

In 2021, Miller-Meeks voted against the Infrastructure Investment and Jobs Act.

Immigration
On July 21, 2021, Miller-Meeks and Deborah Ross co-sponsored the America's CHILDREN Act. The bill would prevent the children of long-term visa holders who came to the U.S. legally with their parents from having their visas expire the day they turn 21. If they have maintained legal status in the U.S. for 10 years and graduated from an institution of higher education, they are eligible to apply for permanent residency.

LGBT rights
In 2021, Miller Meeks was one of 29 Republicans to vote to reauthorize the Violence Against Women Act. This bill expanded legal protections for transgender people, and contained provisions allowing transgender women to use women's shelters and serve time in prisons matching their gender identity rather than by biological sex.

On July 19, 2022, Miller-Meeks and 46 other Republican representatives voted for the Respect for Marriage Act, which would codify the right to same-sex marriage in federal law.

Antitrust bill
In 2022, Meeks was one of 39 Republicans to vote for the Merger Filing Fee Modernization Act of 2022, an antitrust package that would crack down on corporations for anti-competitive behavior.

Committee assignments 

 Committee on Homeland Security
 Subcommittee on Transportation and Maritime Security
 Subcommittee on Emergency Preparedness, Response and Recovery
 Committee on Veterans’ Affairs
 Subcommittee on Health (Chair)
 Subcommittee on Disability Assistance and Memorial Affairs
 Committee on Education and Labor
 Subcommittee on Workforce Protections
 Subcommittee on Higher Education and Workforce Investment
 Select Oversight Subcommittee on the Coronavirus Crisis

Caucus memberships 
 Pandemic Preparedness Caucus (co-chair)
 Public Schools Caucus (co-chair)
 Aluminum Caucus
 Army Caucus
 Biofuels Caucus
 Bus Caucus
 Conservative Climate Caucus
 For Country Caucus
 General Aviation Caucus
 GOP Doctors Caucus
 GOP Healthy Futures Task Force
 Grid Innovation Caucus
 Mental Health Caucus
 Motorcycle Caucus
 Pro-Life Caucus
 Rural Broadband Caucus
 Small Business Caucus
 Sportsmen's Caucus
 Steel Caucus
 Suburban Caucus
 Taiwan Caucus
 Telehealth Caucus
 Western Caucus
 Women, Peace, and Security Caucus

Personal life
Miller-Meeks is a resident of Ottumwa, Iowa. She is married to Curt Meeks, the Compliance Officer at Ottumwa Regional Health Center, and has two children. She is Roman Catholic. Miller-Meeks organized a physician recruitment and retention organization to help bring physicians to southeast Iowa and has served as a court-appointed special advocate volunteer for children.

Electoral history

2008

2010

2014

2018

2020

2022

See also 

Women in the United States House of Representatives

References

External links

Representative Mariannette Miller-Meeks official U.S. House website
 Campaign website
 Iowa State Senate page
 
 

|-

 
|-

 
|-

1955 births
Living people
20th-century American physicians
20th-century American women physicians
21st-century American physicians
21st-century American politicians
21st-century American women politicians
21st-century American women physicians
21st-century Roman Catholics
American ophthalmologists
American women academics
Candidates in the 2008 United States elections
Candidates in the 2010 United States elections
Candidates in the 2014 United States elections
Candidates in the 2020 United States elections
Catholics from Iowa
Catholic politicians from Iowa
Female members of the United States House of Representatives
Republican Party Iowa state senators
Republican Party members of the United States House of Representatives from Iowa
Military personnel from California
Military personnel from Iowa
People from Lassen County, California
People from Ottumwa, Iowa
Physicians from California
Physicians from Iowa
State cabinet secretaries of Iowa
Texas Christian University alumni
Women ophthalmologists
Women state legislators in Iowa
United States Army officers
United States Army reservists
University of Iowa faculty
University of Southern California alumni
University of Texas Health Science Center at Houston alumni
University of Michigan faculty